This is a list of notable events in Latin music (music from Spanish- and Portuguese-speaking regions of Latin America, Latin Europe, and the United States) that took place in 2017.

Events

January–March
January 5Gerardo Ortiz breaks the record for most number ones by a solo artist on the Billboard Regional Mexican Songs chart. The singer placed his eight number one "Regresa Hermosa" on the January 14-dated chart, breaking the tie with Vicente Fernandez.
January 6In their annual report, Nielsen Soundscan found that overall sales of Latin albums and digitally purchased songs decreased compared to their previous report despite a strong increase in music streaming. With the continuing pattern of increased music streams, Latin music as a whole increased by 13.6% compared to 2015, thus making Latin music the third major genre in year-over-year growth following R&B and holiday music. The report also notes the discrepancy in musical styles between the bestselling Latin albums and singles of the year.
January 12Billboard updates the methodology for the Tropical Airplay chart to track airplay of tropical from Spanish-language radio stations Previously, the Tropical Airplay ranked the most-played songs on tropical radio stations of any genre.
January 24Alejandro Fernández's management team files a lawsuit against fellow Mexican singer Luis Miguel in breach of a contract and not paying back the money given to Miguel for the canceled tour that was set to launch last year.
January 31Beginning with the February 11-dated chart, Billboards Top Latin Albums, Latin Pop Albums, Regional Mexican Albums, and its Tropical Albums charts allowed catalog entry into their respective genre-specific charts; a ban the company held for over a decade.
February 23The 29th Annual Lo Nuestro Awards are held at the American Airlines Arena in Miami, Florida. Major winners include CNCO, Carlos Vives, Shakira and J Balvin.
March 15The 25th Annual ASCAP Latin Awards are held at the Condado Vanderbilt Hotel in San Juan, Puerto Rico. "Duele el Corazón" by Enrique Iglesias featuring Wisin is named Song of the Year while Joss Favela is recognized as Composer of the Year and Daddy Yankee receives the Composer/Artist of the Year award. Puerto Rican salsa group El Gran Combo de Puerto Rico receives the Latin Heritage Award and Puerto Rican-American rapper Vico C receives the Vanguard Award.
March 22The 24th BMI Latin Awards are held at the Beverly Wilshire Hotel in Beverly Hill California. "Ginza" by J Balvin is named Contemporary Latin Song of the Year while Gocho and Motiff are recognized as Contemporary Latin Songwriters of the Year. Mexican-American group Los Lobos receives the Icon Award.

April–June
April 24The Recording Industry Association of America (RIAA) reports growth in revenue in the Latin music industry in the United States for the first time since 2005. The growth is attributed to the rise of streaming audio.
April 27The Billboard Latin Music Awards of 2017 take place  at the Ritz Carlton in Miami, Florida. Reggaeton musician Nicky Jam is the biggest winner, with six awards.
May 2Mexican singer Luis Miguel is arrested by US marshals for not paying his former manager William Brockhaus over one million dollars following a court order in July 2016.
May 5For the first time since George W. Bush initiated the annual Cinco de Mayo event in 2001, no musician attends the event in Washington D.C. President Donald Trump does not attend the event, becoming the first president to not host the event. The event is instead hosted by Vice President Mike Pence.
May 13Portugal wins the Eurovision Song Contest 2017 – the country's first win since it began participating in 1964.
May 15"Despacito" by Luis Fonsi and Daddy Yankee becomes the first mostly Spanish-language song to top the Billboard Hot 100 chart in the United States since "Macarena" by Los del Río" in 1996. The success of the song is propelled by Justin Bieber's remix of the song. The song's commercial success renews interest in the Latin music market from recording labels in the United States.

July–December 

 July 9Daddy Yankee becomes the most listened-to artist worldwide on streaming service Spotify, being the first Latin artist to do so.

July 31Spanish writer Daniela Bose, writes on the disparity of women in Spanish music on Spain's music charts. Her report found that consumers replaced Latin pop and Spanish music with reggaeton and trap music; genres that belittle women with lyrics that speak of adulterous acts.
September 19 The Latin Recording Academy postpones the announcement of the nominations for the 18th Annual Latin Grammy Awards due to the earthquake in Mexico which occurred a day before nominations were to be revealed as well as other natural disasters affecting Spanish-speaking communities.
November 16 The 18th Annual Latin Grammy Awards are held at the MGM Grand Garden Arena in Las Vegas, Nevada.
"Despacito" by Luis Fonsi and Daddy Yankee wins the Latin Grammy Awards for Record of the Year and Song of the Year.
Salsa Big Band by Rubén Blades and Roberto Delgado & Orquesta wins the Latin Grammy Award for Album of the Year.
Vicente García wins Best New Artist.

Number-ones albums and singles by country
List of number-one hits of 2017 (Argentina)
List of Hot 100 number-one singles of 2017 (Brazil)
List of number-one songs of 2017 (Colombia)
List of number-one albums of 2017 (Mexico)
List of number-one songs of 2017 (Mexico)
List of number-one albums of 2017 (Portugal)
List of number-one albums of 2017 (Spain)
List of number-one singles of 2017 (Spain)
List of number-one Billboard Latin Albums from the 2010s
List of number-one Billboard Hot Latin Songs of 2017
List of number-one singles of 2017 (Venezuela)

Awards
2017 Premio Lo Nuestro
2017 Billboard Latin Music Awards
2017 Latin American Music Awards
2017 Latin Grammy Awards
2017 Heat Latin Music Awards
2017 MTV Millennial Awards

Albums released

First quarter

January

February

March

Second quarter

April

May

June

Third quarter

July

August

September

Fourth quarter

October

November

December

Dates unknown

Best-selling records

Best-selling albums
The following is a list of the top 10 best-selling Latin albums in the United States in 2017, according to Billboard.

Best-performing songs
The following is a list of the top 10 best-performing Latin songs in the United States in 2017, according to Billboard.

Deaths
January 1Memo Morales, 79, Venezuelan singer
January 13Horacio Guarany, 91, Argentine folkloric singer and writer, cardiac arrest.
January 19Loalwa Braz, 63, Brazilian singer-songwriter ("Lambada"), burns.
January 23Bimba Bosé, 41, Italian-born Spanish model, designer, singer and actress, breast cancer.
January 27Elkin Ramírez, 54, Colombian singer-songwriter (Kraken), brain cancer.
March 8Dave Valentin, 64, American Latin jazz flautist, Parkinson's disease.
March 11Ángel Parra, 73, Chilean singer and songwriter, lung cancer.
April 13José Miguel Class, 78, Puerto Rican singer.
April 14Martín Elías, 26, Colombian vallenato singer (traffic collision).
April 23Jerry Adriani, 70, Brazilian singer and actor (cancer)
April 30Belchior, 70, Brazilian singer and composer
May 19Kid Vinil, 62, Brazilian musician and record producer
June 14Luis Abanto Morales, 93, Peruvian singer and composer.
June 16Eliza Clívia, 37, Brazilian singer, traffic collision.
July 20Wilindoro Cacique, 75, Peruvian Amazonian cumbia musician (Juaneco y Su Combo), pancreatic cancer.
August 4
Luiz Melodia, 66, Brazilian actor, singer, and songwriter (bone marrow cancer)
Jessy Serrata, 63, American Tejano musician, kidney cancer.
August 19Concha Valdés Miranda, 89, Cuban composer
August 26Wilson das Neves, 81, Brazilian percussionist and singer
October 8Coriún Aharonián, 77, Uruguayan electroacoustic music composer and musicologist
November 2María Martha Serra Lima, 72, Argentine ballad and bolero singer

References

 
Latin music by year